Subrata Mitra (12 October 1930 – 7 December 2001) was an Indian cinematographer. Acclaimed for his work in The Apu Trilogy (1955–1959), Mitra often is considered one of the greatest Indian cinematographers.

Early life and education
He was born in Calcutta, Bengal (now Kolkata, West Bengal) to Shanti and Sudhangshu Bhushan Mitra. He was a great-grandson, on his paternal grandmother's side, of the orientalist Brajendranath Dey. He was a younger cousin of the singer Uma Bose and a nephew, even though he was older than him, of the historian Barun Dey. He was educated at Ballygunge Government High School, Kolkata.

Work
At the age of 21, Mitra, who never had operated a motion picture camera, began his career as a cinematographer with Satyajit Ray, the legendary Indian film maker, for Pather Panchali (1955). He continued to work with him for many of Ray's later films. He is known for pioneering the technique of bounce lighting while filming The Apu Trilogy.

Innovations
Satyajit Ray thought that "Subrata Mitra’s camera work is better than Raoul Coutard’s". Coutard was at the time much more acclaimed than Mitra having collaborated with Godard on many of his film projects. One of his most important technical innovations was his application of bounce lighting, pioneering the use of large scale diffusers to match studio lighting with location shooting. According to the Internet Encyclopedia of Cinematographers:

His director Satyajit Ray also stated:

Both Satyajit Ray and Subrata Mitra were greatly influenced by the photography of Henri Cartier-Bresson, in particular his use of natural light. The other great influence was Jean Renoir and it was in fact during the shooting of his film The River, the pair met in its sets.

Commenting on his own photography, Mitra said:

"Every cameraman has his own method of work innovated by his own conviction, taste, etc. One cameraman believes that he can please his audience and himself by glamourising the heroine only; another one believes that the main object of lighting and photography is to create various moods and feelings."

"I feel my most important technical innovation is the use of 'bounce lighting', induced by my love for naturalistic lighting."

"An actor can overact or underact. This equally applies to lighting and cameraman. He has to observe restraint in his work like the actor. I feel that in my own work I have a tendency to 'underact.'"

"My experience in Pather Panchali were rather unusual, because before this I had never touched a movie camera or even worked as an assistant to a cameraman...Almost every shot of Pather Panchali posed a problem for me, innumerable problems, many sleepless nights spent on ruminating over the prospects of the next day's shooting...Pather Panchali had many excellent shots--both technically and artistically, but it had many bad shots too."

Post-retirement
From 1997 until his death, Mitra was an emeritus professor of cinematography at the Satyajit Ray Film and Television Institute (SRFTI) at Kolkata.

Filmography

1955 : Pather Panchali - Directed: Satyajit Ray
1956: Aparajito - Directed: Satyajit Ray
1957: Parash Pathar - Directed: Satyajit Ray
1958: Jalsaghar - Directed: Satyajit Ray
1959: Apur Sansar - Directed: Satyajit Ray
1960: Devi - Directed: Satyajit Ray
1962: Kanchenjungha - Directed: Satyajit Ray
1963: The Householder - Directed: James Ivory
1963: Mahanagar - Directed: Satyajit Ray
1964: Charulata - Directed: Satyajit Ray
1965: Shakespeare Wallah - Directed: James Ivory
1966: Nayak - Directed: Satyajit Ray
1966: Teesri Kasam - Directed: Basu Bhattacharya
1969: The Arch - Directed: Tang Shu Shuen
1969: The Guru - Directed: James Ivory
1970: Bombay Talkie - Directed: James Ivory
1974: Mahatma and the Mad Boy - Directed: Ismail Merchant
1985: New Delhi Times - Directed: Ramesh Sharma

Awards
 1986: National Film Award for Best Cinematography : New Delhi Times
 1986: Padma Shri
 1992: Eastman Kodak Lifetime Achievement Award for Excellence in Cinematography

References

External links
 Biography on Subrata Mitra
 Another biography on Subrata Mitra
 

University of Calcutta alumni
1930 births
2001 deaths
Bengali Hindus
Recipients of the Padma Shri in arts
Best Cinematography National Film Award winners
Artists from Kolkata
Satyajit Ray
20th-century Indian photographers
Cinematographers from West Bengal
20th-century Indian screenwriters